The 2007 Honda 200 was a race in the 2007 IRL IndyCar Series, held at Mid-Ohio Sports Car Course. It was held over the weekend of 20 -July 22, 2007, as the twelfth round of the seventeen-race calendar. It was the inaugural race for the IndyCar Series at the track. Eventual 2012 IndyCar champion Ryan Hunter-Reay made his IndyCar debut at this race.

Classification

References 
IndyCar Series

Honda 200
Indy 200 at Mid-Ohio
Honda 200
Honda 200